St Brigid's Gaelic Athletic Club is a Gaelic Athletic Association club from the Malone Road area in Belfast, County Antrim, Northern Ireland. It was founded in 1998 by Dermot Dowling and Conor McSherry in the parish hall of St Brigid's Church. There was a strong need for a local GAA club to be set up as there were a huge potential number of people keen to get into the GAA in the Malone area. It has been described as a 'city team with a country heart' as many of its founders came from all over Ulster including Armagh, Tyrone and Fermanagh.

History
The club has teams participating in Ladies GAA, Hurling & Football. The Senior football team participate in the ACL Division 1 and Senior Championship.  In 2007, the club fielded their first senior hurling team and won their 1st underage football championship against Gort na Móna at Under-14 level.

In 2008 they saw the opening of Musgrave Park, by former GAA President Nicky Brennan.

Notable players

Senior inter-county players

Men's Gaelic football
 Antrim
 James Loughrey, Deaghlan O'Hagan, Mark Sweeney, William McSorley, Ryan Daly, Dara Edwards, Patrick Finnegan, Ronan Boyle
 Cork
 James Loughrey

External links
 St Brigid's GAC

Gaelic games clubs in County Antrim
Hurling clubs in County Antrim
Sports clubs in Belfast